Reitz Lake is a lake in Carver County, Minnesota, in the United States.

Reitz Lake was named for Frederick Reitz, a pioneer who settled there.

See also
List of lakes in Minnesota

References

Lakes of Minnesota
Lakes of Carver County, Minnesota